Helena Tattermuschová (born January 28, 1933) is a Czech lyric coloratura soprano, known chiefly for her character roles in the operas of Mozart and Janáček.

Tattermuschová was born in Prague and studied vocal performance with Vlasta Linhartová at the Academy of Music in Prague. Upon completion of her studies, she was engaged by the Ostrava Opera where she made her stage debut as Musetta in 1955. By 1956, she was a member of the Prague National Theater opera company where she continued to sing well into the 1980s. She possessed a high lyric soprano voice that tended to cast her into either “daughter” roles or youthful trouser roles for many years into her career.

That distinctively girlish vocal quality inclined Tattermuschová to the soubrette characters in Mozart operas, notably Papagena in The Magic Flute, Zerlina in Don Giovanni and Susanna in The Marriage of Figaro. She also took on the coloratura roles of Rosina in Rossini's The Barber of Seville and Gilda in Verdi's Rigoletto.

Tattermuschová’s singular contribution to opera was her body of work singing the Czech repertoire on the national and international stage as well as on recordings. She enjoyed one of her greatest triumphs in 1970 in the title role of Vixen Sharp-Ears from Janáček’s The Cunning Little Vixen, which she subsequently recorded. Her youthful voice uniquely suited her to the key role of the boy Aljeja in the nearly all-male cast of Janáček’s From the House of the Dead (performed at the 1964 Edinburgh Festival). She was also Krista in The Makropulos Affair.

In addition to her Janáček roles, Tattermuschová sang in the nationalist Czech operas of Smetana and Dvořák. Her stage roles in Smetana included the servant girl Barče in The Kiss, the Councillor’s daughter Blaženka in The Secret and the merry widow Karolina in The Two Widows. In Dvořák’s operas, she was the kitchen boy Turnspit in Rusalka and the schoolmaster’s daughter Terinka in The Jacobin. Outside of Czechoslovakia, she appeared as a guest artist at opera houses in Barcelona, Brussels, Amsterdam, Warsaw, Naples, Venice and Sofia.

Recordings 

 Janáček: The Cunning Little Vixen (as Vixen Sharp-Ears), with Zikmundová, Kroupa and Gregor (Supraphon)
 Janáček: The Cunning Little Vixen (as Cocholka the Hen), with Bohmová, Domanínská and Neumann (Supraphon)
 Janáček: The Makropulos Affair (as Krista), with Prylová, Žídek, Kočí and Gregor (Supraphon)
 Janáček: Jenůfa (as Jano), with Domanínská, Niplová, Pribyl, Žídek and Gregor (Supraphon)
 Janáček: From the House of the Dead (as Aljeja), with Bednář, Blachut, Žídek and Gregor (Supraphon)
 Smetana: Libuše with Niplová, Bednář, Pribyl, Šubrtová, Soukupová, Kroupa, Žídek and Krombholc (Supraphon)
 Orff: Trionfi with Žídek, Tržická, Topinka and Smetáček (Supraphon)
 Kovařovic: Psohlavci with Votava, Blachut, Tikalová, Krásová, Otava and Dyk (Supraphon)
 Ryba: My Lovely Nightingale (Pastorella for soprano, flute, organ & orchestra) with Josifko, Vodraská and Smetáček (Supraphon)
 Honegger: Cris du monde (Oratorio for vocal soloists, chorus and orchestra) with Baudo (Praha)
 Fišer: Lament Over the Ruined Town of Ur (and other works) with  Berman, Tarabova, Maxian, Straus, Belfin and Kuhn (Panton)
 Helena Tattermuschová: Operatic Selections by Smetana et al. (Panton)

References

External links
OPERAlmanac
Supraphon recording catalogue

1933 births
Living people
Czech operatic sopranos
Czechoslovak women opera singers
Musicians from Prague
Recipients of the Thalia Award